Fleetwood Park was a 19th-century harness racing track in what is now the Morrisania section of the Bronx in New York, United States.  The races were a popular form of entertainment, drawing crowds as large as 10,000 spectators, who would come from Manhattan and Brooklyn.  One travel guide described the 1-mile course as "the most famous trotting track in the country".

The track operated under various managements between 1870 and 1898.  Most notable was the New York Driving Club, composed of many wealthy businessmen of New York, including members of the Vanderbilt and Rockefeller families.

Economic pressures forced the track to close in 1898, and within two years the property was being subdivided into residential building lots.  One of the few remaining vestiges of the track's former existence is the meandering route of 167th street, which runs along a portion of the old racecourse.

The club 
For most of the track's lifetime, trotting races were run on the  oval by the New York Driving Club.  In 1892 The Sun's Guide to New York described Fleetwood as "the most famous trotting track in the country".  It noted, however, that interest in harness racing by horse owners had waned, the track had "gone into a decline", was not part of harness racing's Grand Circuit, and that the single annual meeting was "not an important meeting".  In 1893, however, the track was admitted to the circuit.

The Sun's Guide lamented that the track was "famous more for the men who sent their horses there than for great races."  Members of the club included William K. Vanderbilt (William H's son), William Rockefeller, William C. Whitney, Leonard Jerome, Oliver Belmont, Cornelius Bliss, C. Oliver Iselin, Abram Hewitt and Nathan Strauss, with a total membership of over 500 by 1886. Former US president Ulysses S. Grant often attended races at the track.

Newspaper publisher and trotting aficionado Robert Bonner had his stables and Fleetwood Park Club nearby and at one point served as president of the New York Driving club. Bonner was well known for paying large sums for horses.  In 1884 he bought Maude S. from William H. Vanderbilt for $40,000.  Five years later, he purchased Sunol from Leland Stanford for a price which was only disclosed as higher than he paid for Maud S.

Physical description 

Fleetwood Park was located in the town of Morrisania, Westchester County (now the Morrisania section of the Bronx), adjacent to Railroad (now Park) Avenue between 2nd and 5th Streets.  This corresponds to between Webster and Sheridan Avenues and 165th and 167th Street on the modern Bronx street grid.

The covered grandstand, clubhouse, judges stand, and other buildings were clustered along the southwest corner of the track, adjacent to Sheridan Ave.  The clubhouse was a French Second Empire style building which overlooked the track.  Valentine's Manual described the park as "the broad acres of that well-known rendezvous of all lovers of the turf".

The New York Times described the track as "oddly-shaped"; a 1882 map shows it as roughly rectangular with a bulge on one side, yielding 5 turns, 4 to the left and 1 to the right, if run in a counter-clockwise direction.  Modern-day 167th Street diverges from the otherwise rectilinear grid; the oblique portion of the street's route follows the northern leg of the racecourse.

Timeline 
Horses had been raced near this location as far back as 1750, on a race course built by Staats Long Morris, who took advantage of the relatively level land.  It is unknown how long this track lasted, and there is no further record of racing in the area until 1870 when William Morris leased part of his estate to two brothers, Henry and Philip Dater for a 20-year term.  The Daters opened a track on June 8, 1871, but the venture failed and the property reverted to Morris in 1880.  The property was leased in 1881 to the New York Driving Club (Gentlemen's Driving Association in some sources) who ran the track as Fleetwood Park.

The New York Times observed in 1895 that the track had reached 25 years of continuous operation that year, outlasting many of the other trotting tracks of its day.  The paper noted that $200,000 had been invested in grading the terrain of the Morris estate to make it suitable for racing.  A depression at the southeastern end had been filled and rocks at the northern end had to be removed by blasting and cutting.  In 1896, The Driving Club of New York renewed the lease with a $2,500 reduction in rent.  Pressure from real-estate developers, however, led to the track being closed the next year with the last race meeting held on October 8, 1897.  The track was permanently closed on January 1, 1898 when the city began constructing streets on the property.  In 1899 the Empire City Trotting Club began operations at Yonkers Raceway, which was built to replace Fleetwood.

Within a few years of the track being closed, the property was being divided into building lots by real-estate developers.  In August 1900, the clubhouse was the only structure left standing, with the Union Republican Club considering moving the building to their property on 164th Street.  The first part of the property to be developed was the block of Clay Avenue between 165th and 166th Streets, with thirty two semi-detached houses and three apartment buildings erected between 1901 and 1910.  This block is now the Clay Avenue Historic District.

Transportation 

Attendance at races was as large as 10,000 spectators, with the most convenient way to get to the track being trains from Grand Central to nearby Melrose station.  People also came by carriage from New York City, or steamboat from Fulton Market slip in Brooklyn and Peck slip in Manhattan to the Morrisania dock from which they made connections via horse-drawn coaches.  A streetcar line known as the North Third Avenue and Fleetwood Park Railroad (later merged into the Union Railway) ran from 138th Street to the Fleetwood Park entrance.

Fires 
On June 15, 1873, an early morning fire in the stables destroyed 48 stalls, causing an estimated $12,000 damage to the building, plus unknown damages to sulkies and other racing gear.  Two horses worth a total of $11,000 were killed.

Another fire occurred on October 15, 1893, discovered at 8 am.  Two horses perished in the fire, one worth $10,000.  Another horse and his keeper were injured,  Total damages to the buildings and horses was $20,000.  40 stalls were destroyed, which the club rebuilt.  An additional 25-30 stalls were added, bringing the total to about 300.

Miscellaneous 
In 1889, Fleetwood Park and nearby Claremont Park were considered as possible sites for a 1892 World's Fair.  The fair was to be the International Columbian Exposition, celebrating the 400th anniversary of Christopher Columbus finding the new world. In 1890, however, the US Congress designated Chicago as the host city for the World's Columbian Exposition.

When races were not being held, the grounds were used for other activities, including youth baseball games.  Pigeon shooting contests involving live birds and shotguns were held in the park.  A New York City ordinance forbid the discharge of firearms within the city, with Fleetwood Park noted as one of the specific areas exempted from the prohibition.  This exemption was deleted from the ordinance in 1906, noting that the area was "no longer used as a shooting ground".

References

Further reading 

 

1881 establishments in New York (state)
1898 disestablishments in New York (state)
Defunct horse racing venues in New York City
History of the Bronx
Morrisania, Bronx
Sports venues completed in 1881
Sports venues in the Bronx
Harness racing in the United States